Gliese 317 b is an extrasolar planet approximately 50 light-years away in the constellation of Pyxis.  The planet was reported in July 2007 to be orbiting the red dwarf star Gliese 317.  The planet is a Jovian planet that orbits at about 95% of the distance between Earth and the Sun. The orbital period is about 1.9 years, corresponding to a slow orbital velocity of 14.82 km/s.

See also
 Gliese 317 c
 Gliese 436 b

References

Pyxis (constellation)
Exoplanets discovered in 2007
Exoplanets detected by radial velocity
Giant planets
3